Rhytidacris is a genus of grasshoppers in the subfamily Cyrtacanthacridinae with species found in Africa.

Species 
The following species are recognised in the genus Rhytidacris:
 Rhytidacris punctata (Kirby, 1902)
 Rhytidacris tectifera (Karsch, 1896)

References 

Acrididae
Taxa named by Boris Uvarov